S.S.C. Napoli won their second ever Italian championship, thanks to a new club record in points scored over the course of the season. Diego Maradona scored 16 of the side's 57, whilst the contributions of other players such as Careca and Gianfranco Zola gave Napoli enough of an attacking edge to claim the title.

Squad

Transfers

Winter

Competitions

Serie A

League table

Result by round

Matches

Top scorers
  Diego Maradona 16
  Careca 10
  Andrea Carnevale 8
  Massimo Crippa 4

Coppa Italia 

First round

Second round

Group phase-Group B

Semifinals

Coppa UEFA 

Round of 32

Round of 16

Eightfinals

Statistics

Players statistics

References

Sources
RSSSF - Italy 1989/90

S.S.C. Napoli seasons
Napoli
1990